Statistics of Football League First Division in the 1973-74 season.

Overview
Leeds United won the First Division title for the second time in their history. The title was confirmed on 24 April, after title challengers Liverpool lost 1-0 at home to Arsenal.

Relegation was increased from two teams to three this season. Norwich City were relegated on 20 April, despite beating Burnley 1-0 at Carrow Road, Southampton's 1-1 draw with Manchester United sent the Canaries down. Manchester United went down on 27 April, after losing 1-0 at home to their fierce rivals Manchester City and Birmingham City's result going against them with a 2-1 win against relegated Norwich City at St Andrew's. Southampton were also relegated because of Birmingham City's result despite winning 3-0 at Everton.

League standings

Results

Managerial changes

Team locations

Top scorers

References

RSSSF

Football League First Division seasons
Eng
1973–74 Football League
1973–74 in English football leagues

lt:Anglijos futbolo varžybos 1973–1974 m.
hu:1973–1974-es angol labdarúgó-bajnokság (első osztály)
ru:Футбольная лига Англии 1973-1974